The Young-Rainey Star Center is a high-technology and manufacturing center located in Pinellas County, southwestern Florida, United States. It currently houses over 30 businesses, which include a variety of administrative and light manufacturing operations, leased by the county's industrial development authority. 

The Star Center is the former site of the Pinellas Plant, a nuclear weapons manufacturing facility operated by the United States Department of Energy−DOE. It produced radioisotope-powered electronic components for the United States nuclear weapons program.

History 
In 1956, General Electric built the Pinellas Plant on a  plot in Pinellas County, Florida. This site was formerly known as Bryan's Dairy Farm. In 1957, the site was sold to the United States Atomic Energy Commission. In exchange, GE was awarded a 25-year contract to operate the site. GE continued to operate the site for 35 years, until 1992. In 1992 the contract was transferred to Martin Marietta, renamed Lockheed Martin in 1995, who then announced the closure of the site in 1992. 

In March 1995, the facility was formally sold by Lockheed Martin to the Pinellas County government.  DOE and the Pinellas County government jointly redeveloped the site for commercial use.  Portions of the subsurface soils and the shallow aquifer were contaminated with organic solvents and metals, and it was declared a Superfund site.    The Department of Energy−DOE (Atomic Energy Commission successor) radioactive and chemical environmental remediation and closure operations continued at the site until December 1997.

See also

References 

Buildings and structures in Largo, Florida
Industrial buildings and structures in Florida
Companies based in Pinellas County, Florida
Superfund sites in Florida
United States Atomic Energy Commission
United States Department of Energy
1997 establishments in Florida